Nick Gomez is an American actor best known for his roles on The Walking Dead, Dexter and The Red Road.

Career
Gomez began acting as a child. There was a film set near his home town that he would frequently visit, and directors would often use him as an extra. He had his first speaking role in Young Guns II, speaking one word opposite Kiefer Sutherland.

Gomez has had an array of supporting roles in film and television. His most notable television roles are Jay on Treme, Tomas on The Walking Dead, Javier 'El Sapo' Guzman on Dexter, and Frank Morgan on The Red Road.

Gomez's film work includes G.I. Joe: Retaliation, The Starving Games, and Day of Reckoning.

Filmography

Film

Television

Web

References

External links
 

American male television actors
American male film actors
People from Benson, Arizona
Living people
Male actors from Arizona
Hispanic and Latino American male actors
American male actors of Mexican descent
1978 births